Super Imaginative Chogokin (aka S.I.C.) is one of Bandai's popular line-up of die-cast metallic figurines (chogokin) based on the Kamen Rider franchise and other characters created by Shotaro Ishinomori and his production company. The figures are usually modified and differ from its counterpart as seen in the series. It is intended for those riders to closely resemble the ones portrayed in the manga and to have a much darker theme. S.I.C. figures are mostly sculpted by Takayuki Takeya and Kenji Ando.

History
The line debuted in December 1998 with Kikaider. Popularity grew for S.I.C. due to its reimagination of the original comic book characters: S.I.C. reinterprets the late Shotaro Ishinomori's original artwork. The first ten figures were statuettes mounted on stands but for Volume 11: Side Machine and Kikaider the figure was given articulate joints because this set included a bike.

Spin-offs
Due to its popularity, many spin-off lines were created. The first was S.I.C. Takumi-Damashii, small figurines based on their S.I.C. counterparts. A similar S.I.C. line based on the tokusatsu show GARO was created in 2006, called Equip and Prop. Another line is called Rangers Strike Solid, It was released in March 2007, It Is similar to the S.I.C. Takumi-Damashii but the figures' poses were based on a card line by Cardass and the line was dedicated to the long-running Super Sentai. The Movie Realization line debut in 2004, featuring characters such as Devilman, Kamen Rider, Evangelion, Spider-Man, and Batman. In 2009, S.I.C. Kiwami-Tamashii, smaller than the standard version, was released, the first figure being Kamen Rider Hibiki.

S.I.C.

Limited Versions
March 1999 Artist Special Version Kikaider
March 1999 Artist Special Version Bijinder
March 1999 Artist Special Version Kikaider 00
November 1999 Red Hakaider
November 1999 Blue Hakaider
November 1999 Silver Hakaider
November 2000 Robot Detective K (Power Up Version)
August 2003 Another Shadow Moon
January 2005 Doras Red Version
September 2006 Kamen Rider Sabaki, Kamen Rider Eiki & Kamen Rider Danki
September 2007 Kamen Rider Kuuga Rising Forms
November 2008 Kamen Rider Den-O Rod Form & Ax Form

Toei Hero Net
April 2002 S.I.C. Hero Saga Kamen Rider Kuuga Edition
November 2002 Hakaider with Red Hakaider, Blue Hakaider, and Silver Hakaider
November 2003 S.I.C. Official Diorama Story Hero Saga Golgos
July 2004 Kamen Rider Ryuki Blank Form & Kamen Rider Ouja Blank Form
March 2005 Kamen Rider J
July 2005 Kamen Rider Faiz Axel Form
May 2006 Kamen Rider Pre-Amazon
October 2007 Kamen Rider Garren Jack Form
December 2008 Kamen Rider G3 Mild
November 2009 Kamen Rider Den-O Super Climax Form
September 2010 Kamen Rider New Den-O Strike Form
March 2012 Kamen Rider W CycloneJokerGoldXtreme
January 2015 Kamen Rider Leangle Jack form
January 2016 Kamen Rider Garren King Form

Mook Hobby Japan
August 2002 S.I.C. official Diorama Story Kikaider 00 Kikaider Black Version
January 2004 Another RX
June 2005 Kamen Rider Ryuga Survive (Dragblacker)
January 2008 Warring State Period Kamen Rider Armed Hibiki
May 2010 Kamen Rider Den-O Wing Form
October 2011 Kamen Rider W CycloneCylone & JokerJoker

Event
March 2007 Imagination Works Limited Kamen Rider Hibiki Maziora
March 2007 Imagination Works Limited Kamen Rider Ryuga with Dragblacker
July 2007 Imagination Works Ani-Com 2007 Hong Kong Limited Kamen Rider Todoroki Maziora
March 2008 Tamashii Nation 2008 Kamen Rider Wild Chalice
December 2008 70th Shotaro Ishinomori Anniversary Limited Kamen Rider X (Original Version)
March 2009 Tamashii Nation 2009 Momotaros Imagin (Pre-Contract Version)
October 2010 Tamashii Nation 2010 Kamen Rider Wild Chalice (later re-released in April 2011)

Bandai Tamashii Web

June 2009 Kamen Rider Nega Den-O
September 2009 Negataros Imagin
December 2009 Kamen Rider Kiva Emperor Form
March 2010 S.I.C. Kanto 11 Oni -Elite Assembly- (Kamen Rider Goki, Kamen Rider Shoki, Kamen Rider Toki, Kamen Rider Banki)
August 2010 Kamen Rider Den-O Kohana & Naomi
October 2010 Bandai S.I.C. Special Set 6 Altered Humans (from Kamen Rider 1 to Kamen Rider X)
April 2011 Kamen Rider Diend
September 2011 Kamen Rider W Effect Parts Set
January 2012 Kamen Rider Yuuki
July 2012 Kamen Rider Joker
October 2012 Kamen Rider G Den-O
November 2012 Gills Raider & Dark Hopper
March 2013 Kamen Rider OOO Gatakiriba Combo
March 2013 Kamen Rider OOO Effect Set
September 2013 Kamen Rider OOO Shauta Combo
October 2013 Kamen Rider OOO Tajador Combo (Lost Blaze Version)
November 2013 Kamen Rider Cyclone
December 2013 Greeed Uva
February 2014 Kamen Rider TheBee
May 2014 Strengthed Skyrider
June 2014 Greed Mezool
July 2014 Kamen Rider OOO Sagozo Combo
September 2014 Kamen Rider Shin
September 2014 Cyborg Soldier Level 3
November 2014 Kamen Rider OOO Burakawani Combo
January 2015 Kamen Rider Wizard Water Style
April 2015 Kamen Rider OOO Super Tatoba Combo
April 2015 Kamen Rider OOO Tamashii Combo
September 2015 Kamen Rider Birth
October 2015 Kikaider
November 2015 Kamen Rider Birth Prototype
January 2016 Kamen Rider Wizard Infinity Style
February 2016 Hakaider
March 2016 Kamen Rider OOO Latoratar Combo

Other
Silver Kikaider (Limited 50 pieces)
Silver Bijinder (Limited 50 pieces)
Silver Kikaider 00 (Limited 50 pieces)
Indigo Kamen Rider V3
Kamen Rider Hibiki (Clear Color Version)
Kamen Rider Ryuki (Clear Color Version)
Kamen Rider 2 (Dark Helmet Version)

Classics
A series of previously released S.I.C. figures re-issued in new anniversary versions. These editions feature mini-books collected from the "Hero Saga" series serialized in Hobby Japan magazine.

Takumi Damashii 
S.I.C. Takumi Damashii (TD) are similar to its parent model S.I.C., they both take works created by Ishinomori Shotaro but TDs are different because they are a lot smaller and are statuettes which are sculpted in a pose already. Just like S.I.C., after the bike set  TDs allowed the figures to have different poses. Moreover, S.I.C. Takumi Damashii featured as a set, which contains various character, such as Kamen Rider, Kikaider, and many other featured characters. The set also offers color variation for the character figure, aside from secret character that can be obtained in every set. As of 2009 the series has span up to 10 volumes with 3 special volumes & 1 archive.
Volume 1 (Sept. 2003)
Kikaider
Skyzel
Henshin Ninja Arashi
Gattaider
Volume 2 (Dec. 2003)
Kamen Rider 1
Hakaider
Granzel
Zabitan
Volume 3 (Apr. 2004)
Kamen Rider V3 & Riderman
Robocon
Kikaider 01
Iberu & Gobbler
Volume 4 (Nov. 2004)
Kikaider & Side Machine
Bijinder & Side Machine
Inazuman
Kamen Rider Stronger and Tackle
Volume 5 (Mar. 2005)
Kamen Rider Kuuga
Kikaider 00
Hakaider
Bike
Volume 6 (Jul. 2005)
Kamen Rider 1
Waruder
Shadow Moon
Cyclone
Volume 7 (Mar. 2006)
Kamen Rider Black
Kamen Rider Ryuki
Battle Hopper
Robocon
Roboconcar
Special Edition (Sept. 2006)
Red Hakaider & Bike
Blue Hakaider & Bike
Silver Hakaider & Bike
Perfect Kikaider & Side Machine
Bijinder
Kamen Rider Kuuga Ultimate Form
Volume 8 (Mar. 2007)
Kamen Rider Black RX
Akarenger (First Super Sentai S.I.C.)
Kamen Rider Agito (Ground Form, Flame Form, Storm Form)
Machine Tornador
Volume 9 (Nov. 2007)
Kamen Rider 1 (The First)
Cyclone (The First)
Kamen Rider 2 (The First)
Cyclone 2
Kamen Rider Hibiki
Robot Detective K
Special 2nd Edition (Mar. 2008)
Kamen Rider Todoroki
Kamen Rider Zanki
Kamen Rider Hibiki Kurenai
Kamen Rider 1 (The Next)
Kamen Rider 2 (The Next)
Kamen Rider Ibuki
Choujin Bibyun
Choujin Zusheen & Choujin Bashaan
Volume 10 (Nov. 2008)
Riderman
Kamen Rider Nega Den-O
Momotaros Imagin
Kamen Rider Den-O Sword Form
Momoranger
Kamen Rider Den-O Gun Form
ARCHIVES (Mar. 2009)
Inazuman
Kikaider
Hakaider
Kamen Rider 1
Kamen Rider Kuuga Mighty Form
Special 3rd Edition (Jun. 2009)
Kamen Rider New Den-O Strike Form
Kamen Rider V3 (The Next)
Shocker Rider (The Next)
Kamen Rider Den-O Ax Form & Kamen Rider Den-O Rod Form
Kamen Rider Zeronos
Kamen Rider Sabaki
Kamen Rider Eiki
Kamen Rider Danki
Limited Edition
Shocker Rider Set
Kamen Rider 1(Clear ver.) (Exclusive for Tamashii Nations 2008)

Kiwamii Tamashii
These are smaller and more affordable versions of existing S.I.C. figures.

The Faiz Auto Vajin (motorbike that transforms into a robot - 'Battle Mode') is a larger figure than others in the Kiwami Tamashii line, stand at approximately 18 cm instead of the regular 12 cm.

Special/Limited Editions
Kamen Rider Hibiki (Clear Purple Version)
Special prize included for Hyper Hobby Plus Vol. 6/2009
Kamen Rider Hibiki Kurenai
Tamashii Nation 2009 Autumn event exclusive
Hibiki Kurenai was a repaint of the original, as well as having an exclusive extra - a red falcon disc animal. It cannot transform, however.
Momotaros Imagin (Pre-Contract Version)
Tamashii Nation 2010 exclusive
Kamen Rider Nega Den-O
Jusco Shop exclusive

Tamashii Web Exclusive
January 2011 DenLiner DX Set
December 2011 Kamen Rider Agito Flame Form & Storm Form Effect Set
September 2012 Horse Orphnoch (Gallop Mode)
May 2013 Kamen Rider Kuuga 3 Form set (Dragon, Pegasus, Titan)
August 2013 Gouram
November 2013 Kamen Rider Kuuga Rising Mighty & Beat Chaser 2000 Set

References

External links
Tamashii's S.I.C. Page 

Bandai brands
Shotaro Ishinomori
Toy brands
Toy mecha